Vidima can refer to:

Vidima, Lovech Province, a former village that is now a quarter of Apriltsi, Bulgaria.
Ntokozo Vidima (born 13 May 1995), a South African rugby union player.
PFC Vidima-Rakovski, a Bulgarian association football club.
Vidima, a village in Nagaland, India.
A brand of Ideal Standard bathrooms.